Death Before Dishonor XII  was the 12th Death Before Dishonor professional wrestling pay-per-view (PPV) event produced by Ring of Honor (ROH), which took place on August 22 and 23, 2014, two nights at two venues The Turner Hall Ballroom in Milwaukee, Wisconsin and Frontier Fieldhouse in Chicago Ridge, Illinois.

Storylines
Death Before Dishonor XII featured professional wrestling matches, involving different wrestlers from pre-existing scripted feuds, plots, and storylines that played out on ROH's television programs. Wrestlers portrayed villains or heroes as they followed a series of events that built tension and culminated in a wrestling match or series of matches.

Results

Night 1

Night 2

See also
2014 in professional wrestling

References

External links
Ring of Honor's official website

Ring of Honor pay-per-view events
2014 in professional wrestling
2014 in Wisconsin
Events in Milwaukee
Events in Chicago
2014 in Illinois
Events in Illinois
13
Professional wrestling in Milwaukee
Professional wrestling in the Chicago metropolitan area